Kampong Lambak Kiri is a village in the north of Brunei-Muara District, Brunei. The population was 2,791 in 2016. It is one of the villages within Mukim Berakas 'A'. The postcode is BB1214.

See also 
 Kampong Lambak
 Kampong Perpindahan Lambak Kanan

References 

Lambak Kiri